The 2012 ADAC Zurich 24 Hours of Nürburgring was the 40th running of the 24 Hours of Nürburgring. It took place over May 19–20, 2012.

Resume
For 2012:  The race was limited to a maximum of 190 cars/entries (down from a limit of 250 entries in 2011), which started in 3 groups of up to 70 cars (maximum).  Each entry must have between 2 drivers (minimum) and 4 drivers (maximum).  Drivers may drive more than one car (2 maximum).  All drivers were permitted to drive 3 hours per stint (maximum) with all refuelling and pit stops included.  All drivers were required to take a MINIMUM REST TIME of 2 hours (whether driving 1 or 2 cars).

New in 2012:  There was an exciting new "Top-40" qualifying format for the 40 fastest cars on the starting grid, which took place, Friday, after the first 2 qualifying sessions:  "the 40 fastest teams will battle it out on Friday afternoon for the positions at the front end of starting group 1".

As in previous years, the Top 40 Qualifying cars eligible to start, must have flashing lights installed (for better identification of the Top 40 competitors) behind the windscreen on the passenger’s side.

Classes for 2012 
In 2012, there were 28 classes split into 4 divisions.

Race results
Class winners in bold.

References

External links
 2012 24 Hours of Nürburgring official results

Nürburgring 24 Hours
2012 in German motorsport
May 2012 sports events in Germany